The Dagadusheth Halwai Ganapati temple is a Hindu Temple located in  Pune and is dedicated to the Hindu god Ganesh. The temple is visited by over hundred thousand pilgrims every year. Devotees of the temple include celebrities and chief ministers of Maharashtra who visit during the annual ten-day Ganeshotsav festival. The Temple is 130 years old. It celebrated 125 years of its Ganapati in 2017.

History 
Shrimant Dagadusheth Halwai and his wife Laxmibai was a trader and sweet maker settled in Pune. His original halwai shop still exists under the name "Dagdusheth Halwai Sweets" near Datta Mandir in Pune. Eventually he became a successful sweet seller and a rich businessman. In the later 1800s, they lost their only son in a plague epidemic. They were approached by a compassionate sage who advised them to build a Ganesha temple in Pune.

Later, as they did not have any heir, Dagdusheth adopted his nephew Govindsheth (born 1865) who was 9 years old at the time of their death. Govindsheth was born in 1891 in Pune. He replaced the first Ganesh idol by a new one, with the first one still being present at Akra Maruti Chowk. A kind-hearted and generous man, he established one more Ganesh idol in wrestlers training center, which is called Jagoba Dada Talim. This talim was owned by Dagdusheth as he was also a former wrestling trainer. One of the chowk (area) in Pune is named Govind Halwai Chowk, after him. Along with his mother, Govindsheth handled all the programmes like Ganesh Utsav, Datta Jayanti and other festivities. The residence where they resided is now known as Laxmibai Dagdusheth Halwai Sansthan Datta Mandir Trust. Laxmi Road in Pune is named after Laxmibai Dagdusheth halwai. Govindsheth died in 1943. His son Dattatray Govindsheth Halwai, born in 1926, was the one who established the third Ganesh idol replacing the second. This idol, known as Navasacha Ganpati, is the one that is present today in the Dagdusheth temple. It proved to be an epoch-making event in Indian history.

Temple

The temple is a beautiful construction and boasts  a rich history of over 100 years. Jay and Vijay, the two sentinels made of marble catch the eye of all at the outset. The construction is so simple that all the proceedings in the temple along with the beautiful Ganesh idol can be seen even from outside. The Ganesh idol is  2.2 metres tall and 1 metrewide. It is adorned with nearly 40 kilos of gold. The devotees of Ganesh offer Him gold and money and with every offering the Lord gets richer and richer. Moreover, heaps of coconuts offered to the deity are yet another feature of the temple. Daily pooja, abhisheka and the arti of Ganesh are worth attending. The lighting of the temple during the Ganesh festival is marvelous. Shrimant Dagdusheth Ganpati Trust looks into the maintenance of the temple. The temple is situated in the centre of city, local shopping market is also the nearby temple. Various cultural activities like music concerts, bhajans, and Atharvasheersh recitation are organized by the trust.

Shri Datta Mandir placed in Budhwar Peth, Pune was their residential Building.  Dagduseth's grandson govindseth was also famous for his kindness and generosity. In Pune, govind halwai chowk is famous by his name.

He later established the Halwai Ganapati Trust. Bal Gangadhar Tilak, during the British Raj, gave a public form to the Ganesh festival celebrations as a way of getting around an order that barred public meetings.

Temple Trust 
The Shrimant Dagadusheth Halwai Ganapati Trust carries out philanthropic work from the donations received, and is one of the richest in Maharashtra. The trust operates an old age home called Pitashree at Kondhwa in Pune. In the same building the trust provides housing and education for 400 destitute children. Other services provided by the trust include ambulance service for poor and health clinics in tribal belts of Pune District.

Ganesh festival, Gudhi Padwa till Ram Navami are the festivals celebrated by Dagadusheth halwai Ganapati Trust, Pune.

Covid-19 
With rise in the number of COVID-19 cases in the State, the State government has introduced restrictions in temples for the safety of devotees and employees. Temple to remain closed in till 9 April 2021. After more than a year, Maharashtra's religious institutions reopen their doors in October 2021.

See also
 Culture of Pune
 Pune
 List of roads in Pune

References

External links
 Official website

Ganesha temples
Buildings and structures in Pune
Hindu temples in Pune
Culture of Pune
Tourist attractions in Pune